Kelvin Power Station is a coal-fired power station, located in Gauteng near OR Tambo International Airport.

Kelvin is one of only a few power stations in South Africa not owned by Eskom. Until 2001 the power station was the property of the City of Johannesburg, but it has since been privatised, resold a number of times, and is currently owned by Investec and Nedbank Capital.
Kelvin consist of two independent stations. The A station (shut down in 2012) has six 30MW generators and 11 chain grate boilers. The newer B station has seven 60MW generators and seven PF type boilers.

See also

 List of power stations in South Africa

References

External links
 Official website

Coal-fired power stations in South Africa
Buildings and structures in Gauteng
Economy of Gauteng